Make a Wish is a 1937 American musical comedy film directed by Kurt Neumann and starring Bobby Breen, Basil Rathbone and Ralph Forbes.

Plot
While at summer camp in the Maine woods, young Chip Winters (Breen) befriends British composer Johnathan Selden (Rathbone), who left the city high life to try to break his creative block, and is soon playing matchmaker for his widowed singer mother Irene Winters (Claire) and Selden.

Cast 

 Bobby Breen as Chip Winters
 Basil Rathbone Johnny Selden
 Marion Claire as Irene Winters 
 Ralph Forbes as Walter Mays
 Donald Meek as Butler Joseph
 Billy Lee as Pee Wee
 Henry Armetta as Composer Moreta
 Leon Errol as Composer Brennan
 Herbert Rawlinson as Camp Manager Stevens 
 Charles Richman as Mr. Wagner
 Fred Scott as Minstrel
 Lillian Harmer as Clara
 Johnny Arthur as Antoine
 Richard Tucker as 	Grant
 Leonid Kinskey as Moe
 Tommy Ryan as 	Chunky 
 Barbara Barondess as Secretary
 Billy Lechner as Judge
 Lew Kelly as 	Mailman
 Dorothy Appleby as Telephone Girl

Awards
Hugo Riesenfeld received a nomination for the Academy Award for best musical score for this film.

References

External links
 
 
 
 
 

1937 films
1937 musical comedy films
Films directed by Kurt Neumann
American musical comedy films
American black-and-white films
Films produced by Sol Lesser
Films about composers
Films about summer camps
Films set in Maine
Films set in New York City
1930s English-language films
1930s American films